Stigmella macrocarpae is a moth of the family Nepticulidae. It is found in North America in Arkansas, Florida, Georgia, Illinois, Indiana, Kentucky, Maryland, Massachusetts, Michigan, New York, Ohio, Pennsylvania, South Carolina, Virginia, West Virginia, Ontario and British Columbia.

There are probably three generations per year in most of its range.

The larvae feed on Quercus species, including Quercus rubra and the host for which the species is named, Quercus macrocarpa. They mine the leaves of their host plant.

This species was formerly known as Stigmella latifasciella (from its original description by Chambers in 1878), but the name latifasciella had been assigned to a different European species in the same genus by Gottlieb August Wilhelm Herrich-Schäffer in 1855.

External links
A taxonomic revision of the North American species of Stigmella (Lepidoptera: Nepticulidae)

Nepticulidae
Moths of North America
Moths described in 1967